Lake Angascocha (possibly from Quechua anqas blue, qucha lake) is a lake in Peru located in the Huancavelica Region, Huancavelica Province, Acobambilla District. Lake Angascocha lies east of Lake Acchicocha, between Ñawinqucha in the northwest and Chiliqucha in the southeast. The mountain northeast of the lake is named Angascocha, too.

See also
List of lakes in Peru

References

Lakes of Peru
Lakes of Huancavelica Region